Iomega (later LenovoEMC) produced external, portable, and networked data storage products. Established in the 1980s in Roy, Utah, United States, Iomega sold more than 410 million digital storage drives and disks, including the Zip drive floppy disk system. Formerly a public company, it was acquired by EMC Corporation in 2008, and then by Lenovo, which rebranded the product line as LenovoEMC, until discontinuation in 2018.

History 
Iomega started in Roy, Utah, U.S. in 1980 and moved its headquarters to San Diego, California in 2001. For many years, it was a significant name in the data storage industry. Iomega's most famous product, the Zip Drive, offers relatively large amounts of storage on portable disks. The original Zip disk's 100MB capacity is a huge improvement over the decades-long standard of 1.44MB floppy disks. The Zip Drive became a common internal and external peripheral for IBM-compatible and Macintosh personal computers. However, Zip disks sometimes failed after a short period, commonly referred to as the "click of death". This problem, combined with competition from CD-RW drives, caused Zip Drive sales to decline dramatically, even after introducing larger 250MB and 750MB disk versions. Iomega eventually launched a CD-RW drive.

Without the revenue from its proprietary storage cartridges, Iomega's sales and profits declined considerably. Iomega's stock price, which was over $100 at its height in the 1990s, fell to around $2 in the mid-2000s. Trying to find a niche, Iomega released devices such as the HipZip MP3 player, the FotoShow Digital Image Center, and numerous external hard drives, optical drives, and NAS products. None of these products were successful.

In 2012, reporter Vincent Verweij of Dutch broadcaster Katholieke Radio Omroep revealed that at least 16,000 Iomega NAS devices were publicly exposing their users' files on the Internet. This was due Iomega having disabled password security by default. KLM, ING Group, and Ballast Nedam all had confidential material leaked in this manner. Iomega USA acknowledged the problem and said future models (starting February 2013) would have password security enabled by default. The company said it would clearly instruct users about the risks of unsecured data.

Acquisition by EMC

The acquisition was completed in June 2008, making Iomega the SOHO/SMB arm of EMC. EMC kept the Iomega brand name alive with products such as the StorCenter NAS line, ScreenPlay TV Link adapter, and v.Clone virtualization software.

Joint venture with Lenovo: LenovoEMC

In 2013, EMC (part of Dell) formed a joint venture with Chinese technology company Lenovo, named LenovoEMC, that took over Iomega's business. LenovoEMC rebranded all of Iomega's products under its name. LenovoEMC designs products for small and medium-sized businesses that cannot afford enterprise-class data storage. LenovoEMC is part of a broader partnership between the two companies announced in August 2012. The partnership also includes an effort to develop x86-based servers and allowing Lenovo to act as an OEM for some EMC hardware. Lenovo is expected to benefit from the relatively high profit margins of the NAS market. LenovoEMC is part of Lenovo's Enterprise Products Group.

In November 2013, Lenovo announced the construction of a research and development facility near São Paulo, Brazil. This facility would be dedicated to enterprise software and supporting LenovoEMC's development of high-end servers and cloud storage. Construction would cost $100 million and about 100 would be employed at the facility. It would be located in the University of Campinas Science and Technology Park, about 60 miles from São Paulo.

1980–1999 
1980: April 1, Iomega Founded
1982: Released First Bernoulli Box Drive (10MB)
1987: September, Shipped first Bernoulli Box II model (20 MB)
1988: Released Bernoulli Box 44 MB drive
1991: July, Shipped Bernoulli Box 90 MB drive
1992: October, Shipped Bernoulli MultiDisk 150 drive.
1994: October, Shipped Bernoulli 230 drive.
1995: January, Shipped Iomega Ditto Tape Drive
1995: March, Released Zip 100MB Drive
1995: December, Shipped Jaz Drive 1GB Drive
1997: June, Announced Buz Multimedia Producer
1997: November, Unveiled Clik! 40MB Drive
1998: February, Shipped Jaz 2GB Drive
1998: December, Shipped Zip 250MB Drive
1999: Shipped First Internal CD-RW Drive

2000–present
2000: September, Launched HipZip Digital Audio Player
2000: October, Shipped FotoShow Digital Image Center
2000: December, Shipped First External CD-RW Drive
2001: January, Announced Peerless Drive System
2001: March, Shipped DataSafe Network Attached Storage (NAS) Server
 2001: July, eliminating .. one-third of its work force, planning to move from Utah to California.
2002: April, Announced Portable and External Hard Drive Family
2002: August, Shipped Zip 750MB Drive
2002: November, Launched USB Mini Flash Drive
2003: March, Launched iStorage Online Storage
2003: March, Announced External Standard Floppy Drive
2003: June, Announced first DVD-RW drive, shipped 50 millionth Zip drive
2003: November, Introduced Super DVD QuikTouch
2004: February, Shipped CD-RW/DVD-ROM 7-in-1 Card Reader
2004: April, Shipped REV 35GB Drive, shipped Floppy Plus 7-in-1 Card Reader
2004: September, Introduced Wireless NAS Server
2004: October, Introduced REV Autoloader 1000
2005: November, Announced ScreenPlay Multimedia Drive
2006: September, Introduced desktop RAID storage
2008: January, Announced eGo Portable Hard Drive
2008: April, EMC acquired Iomega
2008: April, Announced ScreenPlay HD Multimedia Drive
2008: May, Announced eGo Desktop Hard Drive
2008: August, Introduced ScreenPlay TV Link Multimedia Adapter
2008: September, Announced the new eGo Helium Portable Hard Drive
2008: October, Announced StorCenter ix2, announced ScreenPlay Pro HD Multimedia Drive
2009: January, Shipped Iomega Home Media Network Hard Drive
2009: February, Announced StorCenter ix4-100 Server
2009: April, Ships the StorCenter ix4-200r NAS
2009: May, New Generation of eGo Portable Hard Drives
2009: August, Announced StorCenter ix4-200d NAS
2009: October, Announced StorCenter ix2-200
2010: January, Shipped Iomega iConnect Wireless Data Station
2010: January, Announced ScreenPlay Media Player, Director Edition; announced v.Clone Technology: Take your PC Virtually Anywhere
2010: April, Iomega celebrates 30 years
2010: May, Announced StorCenter ix12-300r NAS
2010: June, Introduced Skin Hard Drive by Iomega
2011: March, introduced Cloud Edition IX series
2013: January, Iomega Corporation was renamed to LenovoEMC Limited, which is a joint venture between Lenovo Group Limited and EMC Corporation. Lenovo owns the majority stake in the new company.

Products 
Iomega designed and manufactured a range of products intended to compete with and ultimately replace the 3.5" floppy disk, notably the Zip drive. Initial Iomega products connected to a computer via SCSI or parallel port; later models used USB and FireWire (1994).

PX4-400d
The 400d was a multi-bay network-attached storage (NAS) device. The 400d was powered by an Intel Atom processor running at 2.13 gigahertz, had 2 gigabytes of RAM, and a SATA 3 controller capable of moving data at 6 gigabits per second. The HDMI-out function enabled monitoring live feeds from surveillance cameras. The unit can be set up and managed without a PC using an external display, keyboard, and mouse. The 400d is LenovoEMC's first product sold with its LifeLine 4.1 software, which added functions such as a domain mode, enhanced Active Directory support and a more robust SDK. McAfee ePolicy Orchestrator was included for centralized security management. All THINK-branded systems from Lenovo pre-installed with Windows 8.1 included LenovoEMC Storage Connector in order make discovery and set-up of the 400d and other LenovoEMC NAS devices smoother.

Lenovo Beacon Home Cloud Centre
At the 2014 International CES, LenovoEMC announced the Lenovo Beacon Home Cloud Centre. The Beacon is a storage device that allows remote sharing of data such as music, pictures, and video. The Beacon allows music and video streaming to multiple devices. Android phones and tablets can be used to control the Beacon. It also has an HDMI port to allow connection to a television or monitor. Up to 6 terabytes of storage, RAID 0 and 1, Wi-Fi, and Bluetooth are all supported.

See also 
 Nomaï, a competitor that was acquired and closed down
 SyQuest Technology

References

External links 

1980 establishments in Utah
2008 disestablishments in Utah
2008 mergers and acquisitions
American companies established in 1980
American companies disestablished in 2008
Computer companies established in 1980
Computer companies disestablished in 2008
Computer storage companies
Defunct computer companies based in California
Defunct computer companies of the United States
Defunct manufacturing companies based in California
Defunct technology companies based in California
Dell EMC
Hard disk drives
Joint ventures
Lenovo
Manufacturing companies established in 1980
Manufacturing companies disestablished in 2008
Technology companies based in San Diego
Technology companies established in 1980
Technology companies disestablished in 2008